Panagiotis Spyrou (born 24 May 1947) is a Greek weightlifter. He competed in the men's middleweight event at the 1972 Summer Olympics.

References

1947 births
Living people
Greek male weightlifters
Olympic weightlifters of Greece
Weightlifters at the 1972 Summer Olympics
Place of birth missing (living people)